Cliff Goddard (born 5 December 1953 in Canberra) is a professor of linguistics at Griffith University, Queensland, Australia.
He is, with Anna Wierzbicka, a leading proponent of the Natural Semantic Metalanguage approach to linguistic analysis.
Goddard's research has explored cognitive and cultural aspects of everyday language and language use, and he is considered a leading scholar in the fields of semantics, and cross-cultural pragmatics. His work spans English, (especially Australian English), indigenous Australian languages (Yankunytjatjara, Pitjantjatjara), and South East Asian languages (especially Malay).

Selected publications

Notes

External links
 Staff Page Griffith University
 Researcher Page NSM Homepage
 NSM Homepage

Living people
Academic staff of Griffith University
Linguists from Australia
Semanticists
Australian cognitive scientists
1953 births